Al-Mu'jam al-Kabir may refer to:

 Al-Mu'jam al-Kabir (Al-Tabarani)
 Al-Mu'jam al-Kabir (dictionary)